The 2021 Kansas State Wildcats baseball team represents Kansas State University during the 2021 NCAA Division I baseball season. The Wildcats play their home games at Tointon Family Stadium as a member of the Big 12 Conference. They are led by head coach Pete Hughes, in his 3rd season at Kansas State.

Previous season
The 2020 Kansas State Wildcats baseball team notched a 10–7 record in February and early March; however, the remainder of the season was abruptly halted on March 13, 2020, when the Big 12 Conference canceled the remainder of the athletics season due to the Coronavirus pandemic.

Personnel

Coaching staff

Roster

Schedule and results

! colspan=2 style="; color:white;" | Regular Season (15–11)
|- valign="top"

|- bgcolor="#bbffbb"
| February 19 || 1:00 pm || FloSports || vs. Oregon State* || || Surprise StadiumSurprise, AZ || W3–2 || Wicks(1–0) || Abel(0–1) || Eckberg(1) || 1,352 || 1–0 || — || StatsStory
|- bgcolor="#ffbbbb"
| February 20 || 6:00 pm || FloSports || vs. * || || Surprise StadiumSurprise, AZ || L5–17 || Jacob(1–0) || Flack(0–1) || — || 845 || 1–1 || — || StatsStory
|- bgcolor="#ffbbbb"
| February 21 || 6:00 pm || FloSports || vs. * || || Surprise StadiumSurprise, AZ || L3–4 || Meza(1–0) || Eckberg(0–1) || — || 368 || 1–2 || — || StatsStory
|- bgcolor="#bbffbb"
| February 22 || 11:00 am || FloSports || vs. Gonzaga* || || Surprise StadiumSurprise, AZ || W6–1 || Ford(1–0) || Spellacy(0–1) || Rodriguez(1) || 316 || 2–2 || — || StatsStory
|- bgcolor="#bbffbb"
| February 26 || 3:00 pm || ESPN+ || * || || Tointon Family StadiumManhattan, KS || W9–8 || Passino(1–0) || Armbrust...(0–1) || Eckberg(2) || 458 || 3–2 || — || StatsStory
|- bgcolor="#bbffbb"
| February 27 || 2:00 pm || ESPN+ || Western Michigan* || || Tointon Family StadiumManhattan, KS || W11–3 || Seymour(1–0) || Miller(0–1) || — || 587 || 4–2 || — || StatsStory
|- bgcolor="#bbffbb"
| February 28 || 12:00 pm || ESPN+ || Western Michigan* || || Tointon Family StadiumManhattan, KS || W2–1 || McCullough(1–0) || Huisman(0–1) || Littlejim(1) || 398 || 5–2 || — || StatsStory
|-

|- bgcolor="#bbffbb"
| March 5 || 3:00 pm || ESPN+ || * ||  || Tointon Family StadiumManhattan, KS || W6–3 || Wicks(2–0) || Hampton(2–1) || Eckberg(3) || 402 || 6–2 || — || StatsStory
|- bgcolor="#ffbbbb"
| March 6 || 1:00 pm || ESPN+ || Eastern Illinois* ||  || Tointon Family StadiumManhattan, KS || L5–6 || Nicholson(2–0) || Seymour(1–1) || Stevenson(2) || 587 || 6–3 || — || StatsStory
|- bgcolor="#ffbbbb"
| March 7 || 1:00 pm || ESPN+ || Eastern Illinois* ||  || Tointon Family StadiumManhattan, KS || L7–14 || Doherty(1–0) || Eckberg(0–2) || — || 587 || 6–4 || — || StatsStory
|- bgcolor="#bbffbb"
| March 9 || 6:00 pm || ESPN+ || * ||  || Tointon Family StadiumManhattan, KS || W15–4 || Herbers(1–0) || McSherry(1–1) || — || 378 || 7–4 || — || StatsStory
|- bgcolor="#bbffbb"
| March 10 || 6:00 pm || ESPN+ || South Dakota State* ||  || Tointon Family StadiumManhattan, KS || W10–0 || Littlejim(1–0) || Bishop(0–1) || — || 297 || 8–4 || — || StatsStory
|- bgcolor="#bbffbb"
| March 12 || 12:00 pm ||  || vs. * || || Reckling ParkHouston, TX || W4–3 || Eckberg(1–2) || Seebach(0–1) || — || 300 || 9–4 || — || StatsStory
|- bgcolor="#bbffbb"
| March 13 || 10:00 am ||  || vs. Northern Illinois* || || Reckling ParkHouston, TX || W3–1(10) || Torres(1–0) || Michaels(0–1) || — || 330 || 10–4 || — || StatsStory
|- bgcolor="#bbffbb"
| March 13 || 2:00 pm ||  || at Rice* || || Reckling ParkHouston, TX || W8–3 || Wicks(3–0) || Garcia(1–1) || — || 1,238 || 11–4 || — || StatsStory
|- bgcolor="#ffbbbb"
| March 14 || 6:00 pm ||  || at Rice* || || Reckling ParkHouston, TX || L0–1 || Wood(1–0) || Littlejim(1–1) || — || 1,041 || 11–5 || — || StatsStory
|- bgcolor="#bbffbb"
| March 19 || 6:00 pm || ESPN+ || * || || Tointon Family StadiumManhattan, KS || W7–1 || Wicks(4–0) || Garley(0–1) || — || 587 || 12–5 || — || StatsStory
|- bgcolor="#ffbbbb"
| March 20 || 4:00 pm || ESPN+ || New Mexico* || || Tointon Family StadiumManhattan, KS || L4–6 || Arbruester(3–1) || Seymour(1–2) || Meza(3) || 587 || 12–6 || — || StatsStory
|- bgcolor="#bbffbb"
| March 21 || 1:00 pm || ESPN+ || New Mexico* || || Tointon Family StadiumManhattan, KS || W17–8 || Torres(2–0) || Campa(1–2) || — || 587 || 13–6 || — || StatsStory
|- bgcolor="#ffbbbb"
| March 23 || 6:00 pm || ESPN+ || at * || || Eck StadiumWichita, KS || L1–5 || Kaminska(1–0) || Herbers(1–1) || Haase(5) || 1,818 || 13–7 || — || StatsStory
|- bgcolor="#ffbbbb"
| March 26 || 6:00 pm || ESPN+ || at #20 Oklahoma State || || O'Brate StadiumStillwater, OK || L5–14 || Scott(5–1) || Wicks(4–1) || — || 3,383 || 13–8 || 0–1 || StatsStory
|- bgcolor="#ffbbbb"
| March 27 || 6:00 pm || ESPN+ || at #20 Oklahoma State || || O'Brate StadiumStillwater, OK || L2–4 || Standlee(2–0) || Littlejim(1–2) || — || 3,846 || 13–9 || 0–2 || StatsStory
|- bgcolor="#ffbbbb"
| March 28 || 1:00 pm || ESPN+ || at #20 Oklahoma State || || O'Brate StadiumStillwater, OK || L2–8 || Wrobleski(2–2) || McCullough(1–1) || — || 3,203 || 13–10 || 0–3 || StatsStory
|-

|- bgcolor="#ffbbbb"
| April 1 || 6:00 pm || ESPN+ || #4 Texas Tech || || Tointon Family StadiumManhattan, KS || L1–17 || Birdsell(4–1) || Wicks(4–2) || — || 404 || 13–11 || 0–4 || StatsStory
|- bgcolor="#bbffbb"
| April 2 || 6:00 pm || ESPN+ || #4 Texas Tech || || Tointon Family StadiumManhattan, KS || W7–2 || Seymour(2–2) || Monteverde(5–1) || Eckberg(4) || 587 || 14–11 || 1–4 || StatsStory
|- bgcolor="#bbffbb"
| April 3 || 4:00 pm || ESPN+ || #4 Texas Tech || || Tointon Family StadiumManhattan, KS || W10–4 || McCullough(2–1) || Montgomery(1–1) || — || 587 || 15–11 || 2–4 || StatsStory
|- align="center" bgcolor=""
| April 6 || 6:00 pm || ESPN+ || * || || Tointon Family StadiumManhattan, KS ||  ||  ||  ||  ||  ||  || — || 
|- align="center" bgcolor=""
| April 7 || 6:00 pm || ESPN+ || UAPB* || || Tointon Family StadiumManhattan, KS ||  ||  ||  ||  ||  ||  || — || 
|- align="center" bgcolor=""
| April 9 || TBD || LHN || at #4 Texas || || UFCU Disch–Falk FieldAustin, TX ||  ||  ||  ||  ||  ||  ||  || 
|- align="center" bgcolor=""
| April 10 || TBD || LHN || at #4 Texas || || UFCU Disch–Falk FieldAustin, TX ||  ||  ||  ||  ||  ||  ||  || 
|- align="center" bgcolor=""
| April 11 || TBD || LHN || at #4 Texas || || UFCU Disch–Falk FieldAustin, TX ||  ||  ||  ||  ||  ||  ||  || 
|- align="center" bgcolor=""
| April 13 || 6:00 pm || ESPN+ || * || || Tointon Family StadiumManhattan, KS ||  ||  ||  ||  ||  ||  || — || 
|- align="center" bgcolor=""
| April 14 || 6:00 pm || ESPN+ || Northern Colorado* || || Tointon Family StadiumManhattan, KS ||  ||  ||  ||  ||  ||  || — || 
|- align="center" bgcolor=""
| April 16 || 6:00 pm || ESPN+ ||  || || Tointon Family StadiumManhattan, KS ||  ||  ||  ||  ||  ||  ||  || 
|- align="center" bgcolor=""
| April 17 || 4:00 pm || ESPN+ || Oklahoma || || Tointon Family StadiumManhattan, KS ||  ||  ||  ||  ||  ||  ||  || 
|- align="center" bgcolor=""
| April 18 || 1:00 pm || ESPN+ || Oklahoma || || Tointon Family StadiumManhattan, KS ||  ||  ||  ||  ||  ||  ||  || 
|- align="center" bgcolor=""
| April 23 || 6:00 pm || ESPN+ ||  || || Tointon Family StadiumManhattan, KS ||  ||  ||  ||  ||  ||  ||  || 
|- align="center" bgcolor=""
| April 24 || 4:00 pm || ESPN+ || West Virginia || || Tointon Family StadiumManhattan, KS ||  ||  ||  ||  ||  ||  ||  || 
|- align="center" bgcolor=""
| April 25 || 11:00 am || ESPN+ || West Virginia || || Tointon Family StadiumManhattan, KS ||  ||  ||  ||  ||  ||  ||  || 
|- align="center" bgcolor=""
| April 27 || 6:00 pm || ESPN+ || Missouri* || || Tointon Family StadiumManhattan, KS ||  ||  ||  ||  ||  ||  || — || 
|- align="center" bgcolor=""
| April 30 || 6:00 pm || ESPN+ || * || || Tointon Family StadiumManhattan, KS ||  ||  ||  ||  ||  ||  || — || 
|-

|- align="center" bgcolor=""
| May 1 || 4:00 pm || ESPN+ || Texas Southern* || || Tointon Family StadiumManhattan, KS ||  ||  ||  ||  ||  ||  || — || 
|- align="center" bgcolor=""
| May 2 || 1:00 pm || ESPN+ || Texas Southern* || || Tointon Family StadiumManhattan, KS ||  ||  ||  ||  ||  ||  || — || 
|- align="center" bgcolor=""
| May 7 || 6:30 pm || ESPN+ || at Baylor || || Baylor BallparkWaco, TX ||  ||  ||  ||  ||  ||  ||  || 
|- align="center" bgcolor=""
| May 8 || 3:00 pm || ESPN+ || at Baylor || || Baylor BallparkWaco, TX ||  ||  ||  ||  ||  ||  ||  || 
|- align="center" bgcolor=""
| May 9 || 1:00 pm || ESPN+ || at Baylor || || Baylor BallparkWaco, TX ||  ||  ||  ||  ||  ||  ||  || 
|- align="center" bgcolor=""
| May 14 || 6:00 pm || ESPN+ || at  || || Hoglund BallparkLawrence, KS ||  ||  ||  ||  ||  ||  ||  || 
|- align="center" bgcolor=""
| May 15 || 2:00 pm || ESPN+ || at Kansas || || Hoglund BallparkLawrence, KS ||  ||  ||  ||  ||  ||  ||  || 
|- align="center" bgcolor=""
| May 16 || 2:00 pm || ESPN+ || at Kansas || || Hoglund BallparkLawrence, KS ||  ||  ||  ||  ||  ||  ||  || 
|- align="center" bgcolor=""
| May 20 || 6:00 pm || ESPN+ || TCU || || Tointon Family StadiumManhattan, KS ||  ||  ||  ||  ||  ||  ||  || 
|- align="center" bgcolor=""
| May 21 || 6:00 pm || ESPN+ || TCU || || Tointon Family StadiumManhattan, KS ||  ||  ||  ||  ||  ||  ||  || 
|- align="center" bgcolor=""
| May 22 || 4:00 pm || ESPN+ || TCU || || Tointon Family StadiumManhattan, KS ||  ||  ||  ||  ||  ||  ||  || 
|-

| style="font-size:88%" | Legend:       = Win       = Loss       = Canceled      Bold = Kansas State team member
|-
| style="font-size:88%" | "*" indicates a non-conference game."#" represents ranking. All rankings from D1Baseball on the date of the contest."()" represents postseason seeding in the Big 12 Tournament or NCAA Regional, respectively.

Rankings

2021 MLB draft

References

Kansas State Wildcats
Kansas State Wildcats baseball seasons
Kansas State Wildcats Baseball